Expressway S19 or express road S19 (in Polish droga ekspresowa S19) is a major road in Poland which has been planned to run from the border crossing to Belarus in Kuźnica through Białystok, Lublin and  Rzeszów, to the border with Slovakia at Barwinek, where it will connect with the future R4 expressway (Slovakia). The road is part of the proposed Via Carpatia route. 

As of May 2022 almost the entire expressway between Lublin and Rzeszów (189.5km) has been completed.

Also, the two existing sections near Rzeszów will receive short extensions and additional carriageways in the coming years; tenders for those sections are already underway.

The planning of the road has not been finalized yet and debate continues over how much of it will be dual carriageway and how much single carriageway (with 3 lanes).  GDDKIA officials are indicating that most of the road will have lower standard single carriageway, which according to them would be sufficient for the expected traffic density and result in significant cost savings.  Local politicians are lobbying to have as much as possible built with dual carriageways.

In late 2013, Polish government officials announced that the section of S19 between Lublin and Rzeszów will receive high priority and be completed by 2020.   As S19 is not considered to be a high priority transport corridor by the European Union (despite earlier hopes that it might qualify as such), there are currently no firm timelines for when the entire S19 might be finished.
A document outlining the future development of transport infrastructure issued by the Polish government in August 2014 projects that the road will be fully completed in 2023.

References

External links
Official page about construction of S-19 section north of Rzeszów

Expressways in Poland
Proposed roads in Poland